Stefano Baldini (born 25 May 1971 in Castelnovo di Sotto, Emilia-Romagna, Italy) is a retired Italian runner who specialized in the marathon. He was the Olympic champion in Athens and was twice European champion (1998 and 2006).

Biography
Baldini was also a world champion in the half marathon, taking the title in Palma de Mallorca in 1996. In the 2004 Summer Olympics, Baldini finished first in the men's marathon, winning a gold medal. He finished ahead of Brazilian Vanderlei de Lima, who was leading the marathon until being pushed off the course by protester Neil Horan.

After a disappointing 2007 season in which he did not complete the London Marathon, Baldini chose to run the New York City Marathon, finishing 4th. Baldini closed his Olympic career at the 2008 Summer Olympics, finishing 12th.

Baldini ended his career in October 2010, having originally planned a final race at the Giro al Sas but deciding against the race because of injury.

Achievements

National titles
He won 13 national championships.
 Italian Athletics Championships
 10,000 metres: 1993, 1994, 1995, 1996, 2001, 2002 (6)
 10 km road: 2010
 Half marathon: 1995, 1998, 2001, 2004, 2006, 2009 (6)

See also
 FIDAL Hall of Fame
 Italian all-time lists - 10000 metres
 Italian all-time lists - half marathon
 Italian all-time lists - Marathon

References

External links
 

1971 births
Living people
Sportspeople from the Province of Reggio Emilia
Italian male long-distance runners
Italian male marathon runners
Olympic athletes of Italy
Olympic gold medalists for Italy
Athletes (track and field) at the 1996 Summer Olympics
Athletes (track and field) at the 2000 Summer Olympics
Athletes (track and field) at the 2004 Summer Olympics
Athletes (track and field) at the 2008 Summer Olympics
Medalists at the 2004 Summer Olympics
World Athletics Championships medalists
World Athletics Championships athletes for Italy
World Athletics Half Marathon Championships winners
European Athletics Championships medalists
European athletics champions for Italy
Olympic gold medalists in athletics (track and field)
Recipients of the Association of International Marathons and Distance Races Best Marathon Runner Award